Remus Niculescu (1927–2005) was a Romanian art historian. Due to his closeness to philosopher Constantin Noica, the Communist regime staged a show trial against him, but he was later rehabilitated.

Notes

1927 births
2005 deaths
Romanian art historians